Powerlifting at the 2004 Summer Paralympics did not have disability categories. There was a requirement for a minimum level of physical disability, which may have been caused by amputation, cerebral palsy, spinal cord injuries or various other specified conditions. The only classification was by body weight. The event was staged in the Nikaia Olympic Weightlifting Hall.

Participating countries

Medal table

Medal summary

Men's events 

Note - Habibollah Mousavi Gold medallist in +100 kg was disqualified after a positive doping test.

Women's events

See also 
Weightlifting at the 2004 Summer Olympics

References

External links
International Paralympic Powerlifting Committee

 
2004 Summer Paralympics events
Paralympics